Venev Point (‘Venev Nos’ \'ve-nev 'nos\) is the rocky east entrance to Berraz Bay on the north coast of Low Island in the South Shetland Islands, Antarctica.

The feature is named after the Bulgarian artist Stoyan Venev (1904-1989).

Location
British mapping in 2009.

Maps
 South Shetland Islands: Smith and Low Islands. Scale 1:150000 topographic map No. 13677. British Antarctic Survey, 2009.
 Antarctic Digital Database (ADD). Scale 1:250000 topographic map of Antarctica. Scientific Committee on Antarctic Research (SCAR). Since 1993, regularly upgraded and updated.

Notes

References
 Venev Point. SCAR Composite Antarctic Gazetteer.
 Bulgarian Antarctic Gazetteer. Antarctic Place-names Commission. (details in Bulgarian, basic data in English)

External links
 Venev Point. Copernix satellite image

Headlands of the South Shetland Islands
Bulgaria and the Antarctic